Al-Mazar Al-Shamali or Northern Al-Mazar is a town in the Irbid Governorate of north-western Jordan. Located 15 km south-west of Irbid it has a population of approximately 20,000 people and the major family (tribe or clan) is AL-Shorman. The region is a range of high series mountains that reach a height approximately 780 meters above the sea level. The main basic characteristics of the region is that it is surrounded by the many forest extended to hundreds kilometers. The forest has many trees such as aaks and pistacia and pine. Also the region rely on basic agricultural crops: wheat, barley, and also on some of the fruit trees such as peaches, apricots, almonds, etc. The olive tree is one of the most important products in the region in addition to grapes.

Al-Mazar Al-Shamali is  the southern parts of Irbid Governorate with its high mountains of astonishing landscape, which are adjacent to Ajloun Mountains. It consists of the following 9 areas or districts: Al-mazar Al-shamali, Enbah, Dayr Yousef, Rhaba, Zobia, Juhfiya, Samad, Zaatarah, Habaka, and Hofa.

References

Populated places in Irbid Governorate